MacRobertson's, officially the MacRobertson's Steam Confectionery Works, was an Australian company that produced chocolates and various other confectionery. The company was founded in 1880 by Sir Macpherson Robertson and takes its name from a combination of his first and last name. The company was based for over 100 years in Fitzroy, Victoria, but later moved to Ringwood, Victoria. The company also became known for introducing chewing gum and cotton candy  (known in Australia as "fairy floss") to Australia.

Macpherson Robertson died in 1945 and in 1967 his heirs sold the company to English confectioner Cadbury, which in 1969 merged with Schweppes Australia to become Cadbury Schweppes Australia. The newly merged company continued to manufacture many of the former company's products including: Freddo, Old Gold, Snack, Columbines and Cherry Ripe; which continued to display the company's distinctive logo on its wrapper until 2002. In 2009, Cadbury Schweppes separated from its beverage business and became Cadbury Australia, which continues to operate the former company's factory in Ringwood.

References

External links 
 Sir Macpherson Robertson at Australian Dictionary of Biography

Australian brands
Australian chocolate companies
Australian companies established in 1880
Companies based in Melbourne
Defunct manufacturing companies of Australia
Food and drink companies established in 1880
Retail companies established in 1880
1967 disestablishments in Australia